The Smallgoods is an Australian indie pop band originally from the Victorian coastal town of Port Fairy, but now based in Melbourne. The band's music draws on influences from 1960s artists such as The Beatles and The Byrds, along with more recent pop influences.

The band was originally a four-piece consisting of brothers, Gus and Lachlan Franklin, Ben Mason and Shags Chamberlain who established themselves on the Warrnambool pub scene in 1999 - Ben and Lachlan were playing in local cover band, Slight Return, Gus having achieved 15 minutes of fame with his Triple J Unearthed winning group, Gramps, and Shags playing keyboards with the Port Fairy band, The Pimps.  "We were called Lukewerm originally, which was kind of on the right track but not the right train. I hated the name. It came about because we shopped this demo around and someone gave us a gig and we needed a name and it just kind of came out. The Smallgoods is a '60s-ish kind of name and we're a '60s-ish kind of band. It kind of stuck, even though it means 'meat products'" - Ben Mason.Their debut album, Listen to the Radio was recorded over two years with the help of Melbourne producer and musician Paul Thomas (The Huxton Creepers, Weddings Parties Anything and Custard).  It was released by Half A Cow records in November 2003 receiving airplay on National Youth broadcaster, Triple J and community radio stations across Australia including 3RRR (Melbourne), PBS (Melbourne), FBi (Sydney), 2SER (Sydney), 3D Radio (Adelaide), 4ZZZ (Brisbane) and RTRFM (Perth). Melbourne's Inpress magazine bestowing 'Single of the Week' status upon the song "Abraham Lincoln", which appeared on a split 7-inch shared with New Yorkers, The Essex Green. The single was released as part of the Singles Club collective, through Low Transit Industries.

In the last two years the Smallgoods have been developing their show alongside acts like The Shins (USA), Ben Kweller (USA), Josh Rouse (USA), The New Folk Implosion (USA), The Brunettes (NZ), Architecture in Helsinki, The Lucksmiths, Midstate Orange and Ground Components, to name a few. This is in addition to a headline shows in Sydney, Canberra, Newcastle and Adelaide, and a notable return to their hometown to appear at the Port Fairy Folk Festival in 2003.

In 2007 the band signed with Melbourne's a new record label at Melbourne's Lost and Lonesome Record Company and with help from engineer Marcus Barczak (Art of Fighting, Midstate Orange, The Small Knives) have completed recording their latest album, Down on the Farm which is due to be released in August 2007.

Discography
 Down on the Farm LP (Lost & Lonesome Recording Co., 11 August 2007)
 "Traipse through the Valley" (Lost & Lonesome Recording Co., July 2007)
 This is the Show EP (Half A Cow, 9 August 2004)
 Listen to the Radio LP (Half A Cow, 3 November 2003)
 "Abraham Lincoln" (2003)
 Get Up EP (Half A Cow, 2002)
 120Y EP (independent, 2000)

Members

Current members
 Shags Chamberlain – synthesisers, keyboards
 Ben Mason – vocals, guitars, bells
 Gus Franklin – vocals, drums, tambourines
 Lachlan Franklin – vocals, guitars, whistles
 Andrew Ben Donnan - bass guitar, good looks

Former members
 Simon Cope - bass guitar
 Ben Browning - bass guitar
 Andrew Cowie - bass guitar

References

External links
Official website
Australian Music Online - Artist Profile

Victoria (Australia) musical groups
Musical groups established in 2009
Low Transit Industries artists